Carry Away is the second studio album by the contemporary worship duo Shane & Shane. The album was released on April 22, 2003 by Inpop Records label, and the producers on the effort is Shane Barnard, Joel Cameron and Shane Everett.

Music and lyrics
Allmusic's Rovi told that "an easygoing folk-pop sound dominates, the boys still manage to rock it up a bit on songs like the propulsive title track." At Christianity Today, Russ Breimeier noted that "the more striking difference between Psalms and Carry Away, however, is the polished production. Psalms was just earthy enough and rough around the edges to be appealing." In addition, he wrote that "Carry Away is a slight lyrical departure from the strictly scriptural Psalms." Greg Inglis of Cross Rhythms highlighted that the album features "tight instrumentation, passionate vocals and subtle production make this an album which really stands out from the pile."

Reception

Critical

Carry Away has received mostly positive reviews from the music critics. Rovi of Allmusic told that "unlike some other Christian pop artists, Barnard and Everett don't do anything to disguise their lyrical intentions; every song on CARRY AWAY deals with faith in an earnest and upfront way." At Christianity Today, Russ Breimeier found that "eespite the quiet ending and the increased leanings to pop, Carry Away is a strong worship album of dazzling musicianship and powerful vocalists." Cross Rhythms' Greg Inglis said that the duo "are still relative unknowns but this is sure to change with this release."

Commercial
For the week of May 3, 2003 music charts by Billboard, Carry Away was on the Billboard 200 national chart at a peak of 149, and the breaking and entering chart selling at the fourth place on the Heatseekers Albums, and it was on the genre charting Christian Albums in the No. 13 slot.

Track listing

Charts

References

2003 albums
Inpop Records albums
Shane & Shane albums